Thomas the Tank Engine is an anthropomorphised fictional tank locomotive in the British Railway Series books by Wilbert Awdry and his son, Christopher, published from 1945. He became the most popular and famous character in the series, and is the titular protagonist in the accompanying television adaptation series Thomas & Friends and its reboot Thomas & Friends: All Engines Go.

Thomas is a blue steam engine and has a number 1 painted on his side. All of the vehicles in The Railway Series were based on prototypical engines; Thomas's basis is the LB&SCR E2 class. Thomas first appeared in 1946 in the second book in the series, Thomas the Tank Engine, and was the focus of the four short stories contained within. In The Railway Series and early episodes of Thomas & Friends, Thomas's best friends are Percy and Toby, though he is also close friends with Edward. Later episodes of Thomas & Friends have Thomas in a trio with James and Percy, and Percy is known as his best friend.

In 1979, British writer and producer Britt Allcroft came across the books,  and arranged a deal to bring the stories to life as the TV series Thomas the Tank Engine & Friends (later simplified to Thomas & Friends). The programme became an award-winning hit around the world, with a vast range of spin-off commercial products.

Prototype and background

When Awdry created Thomas, the engine existed only as a wooden toy made for his son Christopher. This engine looked rather different from the character in the books and television series, and carried the letters NW on its side tanks, which stood for "No Where" according to Awdry.

Thomas wasn't originally based on a prototype; rather, the initial stories were an accompaniment to the toy made for Christopher. After Awdry's wife encouraged him to publish the stories, the publisher of the second book in The Railway Series (Thomas the Tank Engine) hired an illustrator named Reginald Payne. Awdry selected a real locomotive for Payne to work from to create authenticity: a Billinton designed 0-6-0 E2 Class of the London, Brighton and South Coast Railway. This may have been chosen simply because Awdry had a photograph to hand.

Thomas as portrayed by Hornby and the TV series is based on one of six E2 class locomotives fitted with an extension to the front of the water tanks.  Awdry was unsatisfied with one detail of the illustration — the fact that the front end of his running board featured a downward slope, which meant that his front and back buffers were at different levels. This was an illustrator's mistake that was perpetuated in subsequent books. The accident, in Thomas Comes to Breakfast was partly devised as a means of correcting this. Thomas has always been shown with a curved running board in the television series.

Payne was not credited for his illustrations at the time, and it is only since the publication of Brian Sibley's The Thomas the Tank Engine Man that he has started to receive major recognition. It had often been erroneously assumed that C. Reginald Dalby created the character, as he was responsible for illustrating books 3–11 and repainting the illustrations of books 1 and 2.

Although Thomas locomotives are seen today on various heritage railways, the locomotives are either unpowered decoys or converted from other locomotives, as all of the prototype LB&SCR E2 class locomotives were scrapped between 1961 and 1963.

Thomas in The Railway Series
Despite becoming the most popular character in The Railway Series, Thomas was not featured in the first book, The Three Railway Engines.

Thomas was described in the opening to "Thomas and Gordon", the first story in book number two, Thomas the Tank Engine, as:

Thomas arrived on Sodor shortly after he was built in 1915, when The Fat Controller bought the locomotive for a nominal sum to be a pilot engine at Vicarstown. Thomas was used initially as a station pilot engine in the first three stories in book 2, but longed for more important jobs such as pulling the express train like Gordon; his inexperience prevented this. In the fourth story, Thomas and the Breakdown Train, Thomas rescues James and is rewarded with his own branch line.

TV series

Thomas's on-screen appearances in the TV series were developed by Britt Allcroft. The first series of 26 stories premiered in October 1984 on the ITV Network in the UK, with former Beatles drummer/vocalist Ringo Starr as storyteller. The stories were featured as segments as part of Shining Time Station in the US beginning in 1989 with Starr as the show's Mr. Conductor character. From 1991 to 1993, George Carlin replaced Starr as both the storyteller and as Mr. Conductor for Shining Time Station. Carlin also told the Thomas stories for Shining Time Station in 1995.

In 1996, the Thomas stories were segments for Mr. Conductor's Thomas Tales, again featuring George Carlin. Alec Baldwin portrayed Mr. Conductor in the first theatrical film, Thomas and the Magic Railroad (2000), and narrated the series for the US from 1998 to 2003. Michael Angelis narrated the series from 1991 to 2012 in the UK, while Michael Brandon narrated the series from 2004 to 2012 in the US. From 2013 to 2017, the series was narrated by Mark Moraghan until the franchise's upgrade in 2018, when the episodes were told from Thomas's point of view.

Thomas's personality was originally faithful to the character of the books. As the show branched away from the novels however, modifications were made. Thomas became noticeably less arrogant and self-absorbed, developing a more friendly, altruistic and happy go lucky (if still rather over-excitable) side. He also no longer appears to be limited to his branch line and seems to work all over Sodor. These changes in his personality and duties are a result of his "star" status. He is the most popular character in the series, and therefore he has the largest number of appearances, appearing in all of the DVD specials and the movie Thomas and the Magic Railroad.

From Hero of the Rails until Series 18, Thomas was voiced by Martin Sherman (US) and Ben Small (UK). From 2015-2021, Thomas was voiced by John Hasler in the UK, and by Joseph May in the US. Both ended their sessions voicing Thomas once the last episode of the 24th and final series was produced, and the role was taken by child actors in Thomas & Friends: All Engines Go, a 2D-animated reboot of the original series; Meesha Contreras voices Thomas in the US version, while Aaron Barashi claims the role in the UK version.

In The Adventure Begins which is a retelling of Thomas's early days on Sodor, he is a bluish-green colour when he first arrives on Sodor, his tanks are lettered "LBSC" (for the London, Brighton and South Coast Railway) with the number 70 on his bunker. The 70 is a reference to 2015 being the 70th anniversary for The Railway Series, while the LB&SCR E2 class were actually numbered from 100–109. The real life LBSC no. 70 is an A1 class.

In late 2020, Mattel revealed that a new theatrical live-action/animated film is in development with Marc Forster directing and producing, it will be the second theatrical Thomas & Friends film in the franchise, after Thomas and the Magic Railroad. It is unknown who will voice Thomas for this production.

Voice actors

English
 John Bellis (Thomas and the Magic Railroad (original work-prints only)) 
 Eddie Glen (Thomas and the Magic Railroad)
 Martin Sherman (Hero of the Rails – Series 18) (US version)
 Ben Small (Hero of the Rails – Series 18) (UK version)
 Ringo Starr (The Official BBC Children in Need Medley)
 John Hasler (The Adventure Begins – Series 24) (UK version)
 Joseph May (The Adventure Begins – Series 24) (US version)
 Meesha Contreras (Thomas & Friends: All Engines Go) (US version)
 Aaron Barashi (Thomas & Friends: All Engines Go) (UK version)
 TBA (Thomas & Friends: The Movie)

Others
 Keiko Toda (Series 1 – Series 8) (Japanese)
 Kumiko Higa (Calling All Engines! onwards) (Japanese)
 Javier Olguín (Hero of the Rails – Diesel's Ghostly Christmas; Rocky Rescue – The Great Race) (Mexico)
 Shin Yong-Woo (Series 18 – Series 19) (Korean)

Models
Thomas had his genesis in a wooden push-along toy from the early 1940s made by Wilbert Awdry out of a piece of broomstick for his son Christopher. This engine looked rather different from the character in the books and television series and was based on an LNER Class J50, which was going to be his originally intended basis, with smaller side tanks and splashers. He was painted blue with yellow lining and carried the letters NW on his side tanks. Christopher lost this model, although it was recreated for the 70th anniversary. However, Awdry was happy to endorse Payne's account that the locomotive was an LBSC E2, although the first Thomas on the Awdry's model railway, from Stuart Reidpath, lacked extended tanks. In the 1979 Thomas Annual, Awdry wrote:

Thomas Mk1 was retired with its coaches in 1979, Thomas Mk2 having been produced the year before using a Tri-ang 'Jinty' 3F 0-6-0T. After the British model railways manufacturing company Hornby produced the LBSC E2 tank, Awdry gladly adapted one in 1980 to take the role of Thomas Mk3 on his layout, the Ffarquhar branch.

Awdry's requested models, to which Lines Bros. subsidiary, Meccano Ltd, responded with Percy and wagons in 1967. Hornby Hobbies launched their 'The World of Thomas the Tank Engine' in the 1985. This was a 00 gauge range of model railway train sets and models which they made for the next 30 years. For Thomas they used their 1979 model of a LB&SCR model of a Class E2 tank engine which they suitably altered with a face and extended tanks to look like Thomas. Many of the characters in the 'Railway Series' books were thus modelled (with faces) by Hornby, including characters added for the television series. They also supplied suitable coaches, wagons and lineside buildings within the series.

Awards
Thomas was the only fictional character included in The Independent on Sunday's 2009 "Happy List", recognised alongside 98 real-life adults and a therapy dog for making Britain a better and happier place. In 2011, Thomas the Tank Engine featured on a series of 1st class UK postage stamps issued by the Royal Mail to mark the centenary of the birth of its creator, Reverend Wilbert Awdry.

In popular culture

Thomas has been referenced, featured and parodied in popular culture. In 1988, he was parodied on ITV's Spitting Image where he was portrayed as a drunk who went "completely off the rails." In 2009, he appeared in The Official BBC Children in Need Medley where he was voiced by Ringo Starr, who narrated the first two series of Thomas and Friends. In the British comedy show Bobby Davro's TV Weekly, a spoof was created titled "Thomas The Tanked Up Engine" involving Jeremy, the pink engine. Bobby Davro provided the narration by impersonating Ringo Starr.

In Cartoon Network's MAD, Thomas the Tank Engine appears in "Thomas the Unstoppable Tank Engine," a crossover between Thomas the Tank Engine and Unstoppable. A parody of Thomas the Tank Engine was in Robot Chicken. The skit was called "Blow Some Steam." The narrator (Seth Green) spoke like Ringo Starr who was the first narrator for Thomas and Friends. Thomas was voiced by Daniel Radcliffe.

The 2015 Marvel superhero film Ant-Man features a Bachmann HO scale model of Thomas. In the film's climactic battle, Ant-Man and Yellowjacket fight atop Thomas while in their insect sizes until Yellowjacket derails Thomas off the model train tracks and throws him at Ant-Man, who knocks him onto a windowsill. An accident during the fight results in Thomas suddenly growing to the size of a real train and demolishing a large portion of Ant-Man's daughter's house before falling on top of a police car.

Video game players have frequently modified released games to include Thomas and other characters, typically by replacing a boss character with Thomas and using sounds and music from the show. One of the first popular efforts was replacing dragons with engines and trucks in the game The Elder Scrolls: Skyrim in 2013, and Thomas has since been incorporated into other games like Grand Theft Auto V, Sonic the Hedgehog and the 2019 Resident Evil 2 remake.

See also
 The Little Engine That Could

Note
Awdry, Christopher (2005). Sodor: Reading between the Lines. Sodor Enterprises, Spalding. .

References

External links

0-6-0T locomotives
Fictional locomotives
The Railway Series characters
Thomas & Friends characters
Literary characters introduced in 1946
Internet memes